Saint-Herblain is a commune in the Loire-Atlantique department, administrative region of Pays de la Loire (Brittany as historical region), France.

It is the largest suburb of the city of Nantes, and lies adjacent to its west side.

History
The commune is named after the 7th-century AD Saint Hermeland ( and other names; Hermelandus in Breton and Latin), abbot and confessor under the Frankish king Chlothar III.

Population

Breton language

In 2008, 0,36% of the children attended the bilingual schools in primary education.
The school network in Breton Diwan has opened a college in Saint-Herblain, the first in the area.

Transport

The Gare de Basse-Indre-Saint-Herblain railway station is served by regional trains between Nantes and Saint-Nazaire.

Twin towns - sister cities
Saint-Herblain is twinned with:
 Sankt Ingbert, Germany, since 1981
 Waterford City, Ireland, since 1986 where a housing estate is named after the suburb, St Herblain Park
 Viladecans, Spain, since 1991
 N’Diaganiao, Senegal
 Kazanlak, Bulgaria, since 2008
 Cleja, Romania

See also
Communes of the Loire-Atlantique department

References

External links
 Official website 

Communes of Loire-Atlantique